Mauesia simplicis is a species of beetle in the family Cerambycidae. It was described by Moyses and Galileo in 2009.

References

Mauesiini
Beetles described in 2009